Manipur, the Himalayan state of Eastern India is best known for the vibrant fairs and festivals held. Barely a month passes by without any festival.

Here is a monthly list of fairs and festivals:

January 
Imoinu Iratpa
Gaan-Ngai
Republic Day

February
Sararswati Puja
Lui Ngai Ni

March 
Yaosang
Maha Shivaratri

April 
Sajibu Nongma Panba
Good Friday

May 
Meitei calendar birthday

June 
Id ul-Fitr

July
 Sanamahi Ahong Khong Chingba
 Rath Yatra

August
 Janmashtami

September

 Heikru Hidongba

October
Panthoibi Iratpa
Kwaak Taanba
Ningol Chakouba
Diwali

November
Sangai festival

December
Christmas

References

Festivals in Manipur
Manipur-related lists
Manipur